Charles P. Pedroes  (October 27, 1869 – August 6, 1927), was a Major League Baseball outfielder in 1902. He was the first Cuban-born player in MLB history.

External links 

1869 births
1927 deaths
Baseball players from Havana
Major League Baseball outfielders
Major League Baseball players from Cuba
Cuban expatriate baseball players in the United States
Chicago Orphans players
Chicago Maroons players
Marquette Undertakers players
Oshkosh Indians players
Kansas City Blues (baseball) players
Lincoln Treeplanters players
Omaha Omahogs players
Columbus Babies players
Columbus River Snipes players
Mobile Blackbirds players
Oswego Grays players